Kyle Patrick Dickherber (born May 20, 1986) is an American singer, songwriter and producer. He has earned multiple gold records as an artist, and over 100 million streams as a producer & songwriter. He was formerly the lead singer of Boston power pop band The Click Five, which saw numerous radio hits from 2007–2010.

Personal life 
Kyle was raised in Marietta, Georgia. At the age of 11, he began performing music, citing Eric Clapton and his bands Derek & The Dominos, Cream, Stevie Ray Vaughan Pink Floyd and James Taylor as his early influences. Kyle graduated from Lassiter High School and later moved to Boston to attend Berklee College of Music on a scholarship where he studied songwriting for guitarists.

In 2007, he left his studies to join The Click Five as the lead vocalist and rhythm guitarist.

In 2011, Kyle was a Celebrity Ambassador with MTV EXIT, performing countries like Cambodia and Thailand to raise awareness about human trafficking. He visited shelters to interact with human trafficking victims, as well as to hear their life stories. He was also involved with the Human Trafficking Awareness Council and performed at the 2011 Freedom Walk and rally against human trafficking in New York City.

In addition to his performances to raise awareness about human trafficking, Kyle was also an active participant in the annual New York City Marathon to raise funds for charity. In 2010, the funds he raised went to Team For Kids, and in 2011, to the Christopher & Dana Reeve Foundation.

In 2021, Kyle was in a motorcyle accident, where he broke his neck in two places.

He currently resides in Los Angeles, California with his girlfriend Sophie Bruza.

Career 
Despite being from the United States, Patrick's early success was found in Asia, especially in the region of Southeast Asia, earning gold records in countries like Indonesia, Singapore, Malaysia and Philippines. After touring with The Click Five, Patrick focused on producing music and doing a solo career.

As a producer and songwriter for various artists, his work has accumulated over 75 million streams on Spotify, Apple Music, and Youtube, numerous Billboard features, and a Billboard #1 in the Dance category.

2005–2007: Beginnings 
Patrick formed a band with close friends from high school, Patrick McGraw and Billy Justineau, and later added friend Josh Dockins to the lineup. The band was called Hillside Manor. It was formed circa 2004. Patrick left Hillside Manor to pursue The Click Five, but the remaining band members continued to write and perform under the name for a few years following.

Before he officially joined The Click Five, Patrick had co-written the song "Empty" with The Click Five's keyboardist Ben Romans. After The Click Five recorded and released the song featuring Patrick's vocals, "Empty" became a #1 radio hit in multiple countries throughout Southeast Asia.

2007–2013: The Click Five 
Patrick sang the lead vocals on The Click Five's sophomore album, Modern Minds and Pastimes. With Patrick at the helm, the band has sold over two million records to date and had number-one singles in no less than eight countries. 2008 saw The Click Five headline sold-out arenas on three continents as well as perform with heavyweights like The Black Eyed Peas, The Script, and Placebo. Cheryl Leong of MTV described Patrick's voice as "Deep, Powerful, Steady, and Strong." The year culminated in a sea of wins for the band, including the Knockout Award from MTV Asia, Band of the Year from Singapore's 987FM, and Most Outstanding Pop Act at the Boston Music Awards.

The band's third studio release, TCV, was released exclusively in Singapore on November 16, 2010, and subsequently released to other countries. Three singles were released: "I Quit! I Quit! I Quit!", "The Way It Goes" and "Don't Let Me Go".

The third single, "Don't Let Me Go", was picked up by MTV EXIT to help raise awareness for human trafficking. The band filmed a music video with MTV EXIT. The music video includes real-life statistics of human trafficking and makes use of blindfolds to show that people need to be more aware of what happens around them.

Together with the band, they traveled to Phnom Penh, where they headlined MTV EXIT's free concert with Korean girl band After School, performing in front of an audience of approximately 40,000. They visited the Transitions shelter, a home for young girls who have managed to escape the wrath of human trafficking.

The Click Five officially disbanded on January 14, 2013.

2010–2012: Solo career, production work 
Patrick embarked on a solo career in May 2010, when he released his first solo EP, KP, on Bandcamp. He remained a member of The Click Five until the band decided to part ways on January 14, 2013.

For KP, fans were able to download the 6-song EP, at a price of their choice. He gave an explanation, saying, "The price is pay-what-you-want -- including zero. You can pay any amount, or pay nothing. It is your choice. This music means the world to me, and I want you to have it. " All 6 songs on the EP were self-produced, and featured a wide variety of instruments on it, all performed by Kyle Patrick.

From mid-December 2011 to early January 2012, Patrick traveled to Singapore, Kuala Lumpur and Phnom Penh to promote his solo work. He gave interviews and performed for radio stations such as 987FM, Fly FM and Lush 99.5FM. In addition to that, he performed private shows for fans. He performed at TAB, an intimate live music venue in Singapore, to a sold-out crowd.

Patrick released his second solo EP, Kyle Patrick on July 20, 2012. The EP consists of five tracks: "Follow Your Heartbeat", "Go For Gold!", "Wild Ways", "Baby Don't Board That Plane" and a cover of "Ain't No Sunshine". Patrick stated that the EP had been in the works for 5 years, and he had started working on it when he was in college.

On August 15, 2012, Patrick was invited to perform at MTV Sessions at MTV Asia, becoming the third artist to perform at MTV Sessions after Vanness Wu and James Morrison. The show was filmed in front of an intimate audience of 200 people, and the performance aired on MTV Asia on September 8, 2012.

Patrick performed in Dumaguete on August 17, 2012, for an MTV EXIT roadshow. In August 2012, Patrick announced that he would be accompanying British-Irish boy band The Wanted on their Asian tour, and would play in Kuala Lumpur and in Jakarta with the band as the opening act.

2016: Production & Songwriting 
As a producer and songwriter, Patrick worked with emerging artists SVĒ, Jesse Ruben, Beach Tiger, Spirit Twin, Gryps, Rah-C, Shea Diamond, among others, and has seen over 75 million streams across all streaming platforms.

2022: PACER 
In February 2022, Patrick announced via his Instagram account that he will be returning under new alias, PACER, after a 10 year hiatus as a solo artist.

Discography

EPs

Awards 
Independent Music Awards 2013: "Follow Your Heartbeat" – Best Pop Song

References

External links 
 
 Click Five website

1986 births
Living people
Musicians from Atlanta
American male singer-songwriters
American rock singers
American rock songwriters
American rock guitarists
American male guitarists
Berklee College of Music alumni
Guitarists from Georgia (U.S. state)
21st-century American singers
21st-century American guitarists
21st-century American male singers
Singer-songwriters from Georgia (U.S. state)